Mark Burdis (born 2 March 1968) is an English actor who started his career at the age of six in 1974 in the Plague of London (LWT). He currently works as a boxing ring announcer, and is a co-owner of Roma Security Ltd.

Early life
He attended Holloway School and the Anna Scher Theatre in Islington London and he received the Rowena Roberts comedy award from Michael Caine in 1986.

Television
Burdis is most well known for his role as Christopher "Stewpot" Stewart in the BBC Television Children's show Grange Hill from 1981 to 1985. His later television work has included appearing in the award-winning BBC Television Police mockumentary Operation Good Guys.

Burdis played PC Naylor alongside David Jason in the series A Touch Of Frost (Yorkshire TV).

In 1985, he appeared in To Hull and Back, the first feature length edition of Only Fools And Horses, playing garage mechanic Colin, who works for Boycie.

Mark also starred as Scatto in the BBC'S children's  The Roman Mysteries.

He also appeared in The Bill playing Joe, the brother of DC Paul Riley.

In 1996, Mark played the role of market stallholder Gary Rawlings in  EastEnders , a rival fruit and veg stall to Mark Fowler. 

For several years, Burdis has worked as an announcer for boxing matches.

Theatre
He has also played roles in West End theatre productions such as A Slice of Saturday Night and The Good Woman of Sichuan.

Film
Burdis had a leading role in Final Cut, starring Jude Law, Ray Winstone, and Kathy Burke; and starred in Love, Honour and Obey, with Jude Law, Ray Winstone, and Jonny Lee Miller. Mark has a leading role in the 2013 movie "Still Waters" starring John Hannah.

His appearances on film include playing the character of "Mark" in the 1990 release of The Krays.

Personal life
He is the younger brother of the British actor, film producer, director, and screenwriter, Ray Burdis.

Partial filmography
Never Never Land (1980) – Cliff
Clockwise (1986) – Glen Scully
The Krays (1990) – Mark
The Runner (1992) – Marco the dude
I.D. (1995) – Previous Team #1
Final Cut (1998) – Mark
Love, Honour and Obey (2000) – Mark
Mike Bassett: England Manager (2001) – Mail journalist
The Wee Man (2013) – Comedian
Angel (2015) – Mark

References

External links

BBC Comedy Guide for Operation Good Guys (Includes pictures and video clips of the show)

People from Islington (district)
People educated at Holloway School
Living people
1968 births
English male child actors
English male stage actors
English male film actors
Public address announcers